This is a list of the main career statistics of professional tennis player Boris Becker.

Performance timelines

Singles

1 As part of the ATP Masters Series, held in Stockholm from 1990 to 1994, Essen in 1995 and Stuttgart from 1996 onwards.

Doubles

1 As part of the ATP Masters Series, held in Stockholm from 1990 to 1994, Essen in 1995 and Stuttgart from 1996 onwards.

Grand Slam finals

Singles: 10 (6–4)

Grand Prix / ATP year-end championships finals

Singles: 8 (3–5)

WCT year-end championships

Singles: 2 (1–1)

Grand Slam Cup

Singles: 1 (1–0)

ATP Super 9 finals (since 1990)

Singles: 11 (5–6)

Note: before the ATP took over running the men's professional tour in 1990 the Grand Prix Tour had a series of events that were precursors to the Masters Series known as the Grand Prix Super Series.

Olympic finals

Doubles: 1 (1–0)

Career finals

Singles: 77 (49 titles, 28 runner-ups)

Doubles: 27 (15 titles, 12 runner-ups)

Team competition: 6 (5 titles, 1 runner-up)

Top 10 wins
Becker has a 121–65 record (65.1%) against players who were, at the time the match was played, ranked in the top 10.

Record against No. 1 players
Becker's match record against players who have been ranked world No. 1.

External links
 
 

Becker, Boris